"Say I Am (What I Am)" is a song written by Barbara and George Tomsco and was recorded by Tommy James and the Shondells for their 1966 album, Hanky Panky. The song reached #21 on The Billboard Hot 100 in 1966. The song also reached #12 in Canada.

Cover versions
The Fireballs also released a version in 1966 that was the B-side to their song "Torquay Two".
Another cover of the song was also released in 1966 by Stu Mitchell & Doug Roberts in the Norman Petty's studios.

References

1966 songs
1966 singles
Tommy James and the Shondells songs
Roulette Records singles